Kunzea opposita  is a plant in the myrtle family, Myrtaceae and is endemic to eastern Australia. It is a spindly shrub which has small leaves arranged in opposite pairs, and pink flowers with five petals and many stamens, the stamens much longer than the petals. It usually grows in woodland or on exposed cliffs.

Description
The leaves are glabrous. The flowers are arranged in rounded groups of five to nine on the ends of the branches.

Taxonomy and naming
Kunzea opposita was first formally described in 1867 by Ferdinand von Mueller and the description was published in Fragmenta phytographiae Australiae. The specific epithet (opposita) is a Latin word meaning "on the other side" or "contrary".

Distribution and habitat
This kunzea grows in woodland, forest or exposed cliffs north of the Mount Kaputar National Park in New South Wales and in south-east Queensland.

References

opposita
Flora of New South Wales
Flora of Queensland
Plants described in 1867
Myrtales of Australia
Endemic flora of Australia
Taxa named by Ferdinand von Mueller